Leon-Jean-Marie De Smedt (3 December 1881 – 16 November 1951) was a Belgian Catholic priest, missionary, and Bishop of the Roman Catholic Diocese of Xiwanzi between 1931 and 1951. He was a member of the CICM Missionaries.

Biography 
Leon-Jean-Marie De Smedt was born in Sint-Niklaas, Flemish Region, Belgium, on 3 December 1881. In 1899, he joined the Assembly of the Immaculate Heart of Mary. He was ordained a priest on 16 July 1905. In 1906, the CICM Missionaries sent him to preach in the Roman Catholic Diocese of Xiwanzi. On 14 December 1931, Pope Pius XI appointed him Bishop of the Roman Catholic Diocese of Xiwanzi, succeeding Everard Ter Laak.

After the outbreak of the Pacific War, Leon-Jean-Marie De Smedt and other Belgian missionaries were detained by the Imperial Japanese Army in both Weixian Internment Camp and Beiping Internment Camp, until they were released in 1945. During the Chinese Civil War, the Cathedral was completely destroyed. Leon-Jean-Marie De Smedt moved to Zhangjiakou.

On 24 May 1951, Leon-Jean-Marie De Smedt held a consecration ceremony for Assistant Bishop Melchior Zhang Kexing. On 20 September 1951, he was arrested by the Communist government and the Legion of Mary was dissolved. Leon-Jean-Marie De Smedt died in prison on November 16.

References 

1881 births
1951 deaths
People from Sint-Niklaas
20th-century Belgian Roman Catholic priests
20th-century Roman Catholic bishops in China
Roman Catholic missionaries in China
Belgian prisoners of war in World War II
Belgian people who died in prison custody